The men's flyweight event was part of the boxing programme at the 1972 Summer Olympics. The weight class allowed boxers of up to 51 kilograms to compete. The competition was held from 27 August to 10 September 1972. 36 boxers from 36 nations competed.

Medalists

Results
The following boxers took part in the event:

First round
 Leo Rwabwogo (UGA) def. Jorge Acuña (URU), 5:0
 Maurice O'Sullivan (GBR) def. Rabah Kaloufi (FRA), 3:2
 Fujio Nagai (JPN) def. Renato Fortaleza (PHI), 4:1
 Douglas Rodríguez (CUB) def. Jorge Mejia (ECU), 5:0
 Gerd Schubert (FRG) def. Phar Khong (CMB), walk-over
 Orn-Chim Chawalit (THA) def. Sandor Orbán (HUN), walk-over
 Arturo Delgado (MEX) def. Salvador Miranda (NIC), TKO-3

Second round
 Leszek Blazynski (POL) def. Chander Narayanan (IND), 3:2
 You Man-Chong (KOR) def. Saidi Tambwe (TNZ), 5:0
 Niamdash Batsuren (MGL) def. Antonio García (ESP), 4:1
 Calixto Perez (COL) def. Martin Vargas (CHL), 5:0
 Tim Dement (USA) def. Ali Gharbi (TUN), 5:0
 Georgi Kostadinov (BUL) def. Jan Balouch (PAK), TKO-2
 Chris Ius (CAN) def. Ali Ouabbou (MAR), 3:2
 Boris Zoriktuyev (URS) def. Dawla Vanlal (BUR), TKO-3
 Franco Udella (ITA) def. Felix Maina (KEN), 5:0
 Constantin Gruescu (ROU) def. Kemal Sonunur (TUR), 5:0
 Douglas Rodríguez (CUB) def. Fujio Nagai (JPN), 5:0
 Leo Rwabwogo (UGA) def. Maurice O'Sullivan (GBR), TKO-1
 Orn-Chim Chawalit (THA) def. Gerd Schubert (FRG), 4:1
 Mohamed Selim (EGY) def. Wilfredo Gómez (PUR), 4:1
 Neil McLaughlin (IRL) def. Abaker Saed Mohamed (SUD), 5:0

Third round
 Leszek Blazynski (POL) def. Arturo Delgado (MEX), 5:0
 You Man-Chong (KOR) def. Niamdash Batsuren (MGL), 4:1
 Calixto Perez (COL) def. Tim Dement (USA), 5:0
 Georgi Kostadinov (BUL) def. Chris Ius (CAN), 5:0
 Boris Zoriktuyev (URS) def. Franco Udella (ITA), 4:1
 Douglas Rodríguez (CUB) def. Constantin Gruescu (ROU), 3:2
 Leo Rwabwogo (UGA) def. Orn-Chim Chawalit (THA), 4:1
 Neil McLaughlin (IRL) def. Mohamed Selim (EGY), KO-2

Quarterfinals
 Leszek Blazynski (POL) def. You Man-Chong (KOR), 3:2
 Georgi Kostadinov (BUL) def. Calixto Perez (COL), 3:2
 Douglas Rodríguez (CUB) def. Boris Zoriktuyev (URS), TKO-3
 Leo Rwabwogo (UGA) def. Neil McLaughlin (IRL), TKO-3

Semifinals
 Georgi Kostadinov (BUL) def. Leszek Blazynski (POL), 5:0
 Leo Rwabwogo (UGA) def. Douglas Rodríguez (CUB), 3:2

Final
 Georgi Kostadinov (BUL) def. Leo Rwabwogo (UGA), 5:0

References

Flyweight